Praemastus is a genus of moths in the subfamily Arctiinae. The genus was erected by Hervé de Toulgoët in 1991.

Species
 Praemastus albicinctus Toulgoët, 1990
 Praemastus albipuncta Hampson, 1901
 Praemastus cymothoë Druce, 1895
 Praemastus flavidus Dognin, 1912
 Praemastus fulvizonata Hampson, 1909
 Praemastus minerva Dognin, 1891
 Praemastus rhodator Hampson, 1901
 Praemastus roseicorpus Rothschild, 1935
 Praemastus steinbachi Rothschild, 1909

References

Arctiinae